Graeme English (25 September 1964 – 18 February 2021) was a British wrestler. He competed in the men's freestyle 90 kg at the 1988 Summer Olympics.

References

External links
 

1964 births
2021 deaths
British male sport wrestlers
Olympic wrestlers of Great Britain
Wrestlers at the 1988 Summer Olympics
People from Kilsyth
Commonwealth Games bronze medallists for Scotland
Commonwealth Games medallists in wrestling
Wrestlers at the 1986 Commonwealth Games
Wrestlers at the 1994 Commonwealth Games
Place of death missing
Medallists at the 1986 Commonwealth Games
Medallists at the 1994 Commonwealth Games